Desolation Rose is the twelfth studio album by the progressive rock band The Flower Kings, released on 28 October 2013. The album peaked at #35 in the 2013 Top Heatseekers chart.

Track listing

Disc One

Bonus Disc

Personnel
 Roine Stolt - vocals, guitars
 Hasse Fröberg - vocals, guitars
 Jonas Reingold - bass guitar
 Tomas Bodin - keyboards
 Felix Lehrmann - drums

Guest musicians
 Michael Stolt - chorus vocals (10)
 Declan Burke - chorus vocals (10)
 Nad Sylvan - chorus vocals (10)
 Andy Tillison - chorus vocals (10)
 Edgel Groves, Sr. - chorus vocals (10)
 Edgel Groves, Jr. - chorus vocals (10)
 Daniel Gordon - chorus vocals (10)

Charts

References

The Flower Kings albums
2013 albums